The Soviet Union's 1973 nuclear test series was a group of 17 nuclear tests conducted in 1973. These tests  followed the 1972 Soviet nuclear tests series and preceded the 1974 Soviet nuclear tests series.

References

1973
1973 in the Soviet Union
1973 in military history
Explosions in 1973